The Olympic Tower in the Olympic Park, Munich has an overall height of  and a weight of 52,500 tons. At a height of  there is an observation platform as well as an exhibition commemorating the 50th Anniversary of the Tower. Previously in that space was a small rock and roll museum housing various memorabilia. Since its opening in 1968, the tower has registered over 43 million visitors (as of 2018). At a height of  there is a revolving restaurant, which seats 230 people. A full revolution takes 53 minutes. The travel time is about 30 seconds. The tower is open daily from 09:00 to 24:00.

There is a concept of making Virtual Reality weather timelapse service from Olympiaturm. In case it were implemented, it would become the first tower worldwide with such function.

Gallery

List of channels
The following radio and television stations broadcast from the Olympiaturm.

Analogue FM radio
89 MHz: Radio 2Day
92.4 MHz: Radio Horeb/Radio Lora/Radio Feierwerk/Münchner Kirchenradio/CRM/Radio München
93.3 MHz: Energy München
95.5 MHz: 95,5 Charivari
96.3 MHz: Gong 96.3
101.3 MHz: Antenne Bayern 
107.2 MHz: Klassik Radio

Digital radio (DAB)/Digital mobile television (DMB)
Block 11D: 222.064 MHz (DAB)
Deutschlandfunk
Deutschlandradio Kultur
Nova Radio
Digital Classix/Radio Opera
Fantasy Bayern
Gong Mobil
Radio DeLuxe
Bayern 1
Bayern 2 plus
Bayern 3
Das Erste (DMB)
Block 12D: 229.072 MHz (DAB)
Bayern 2 plus
Bayern 4 Klassik
B5 plus
Bayern plus
On3radio
BR Traffic News
Rock Antenne
Radio Galaxy

Digital television (DVB-T)
UHF 26: 514 MHz
DVB-H Mobile 3.0 test
UHF 34: 578 MHz - RTL Group
RTL Television
RTL II
Super RTL
VOX
UHF 35: 586 MHz - ZDF
ZDF
3sat
ZDFinfokanal
KI.KA/ZDFneo
UHF 48: 690 MHz - ProSiebenSat.1 Media
ProSieben
Sat.1
kabel eins
N24
UHF 52: 722 MHz: Mixed private channels
Euronews
münchen.tv
HSE24
UHF 54: 738 MHz - ARD national programming
Das Erste (BR)
arte
Phoenix
EinsPlus
UHF 56: 754 MHz - ARD/BR regional programming (South Bavaria)
Bayerisches Fernsehen (Swabia/Old Bavaria)
BR-alpha
SWR Fernsehen (Baden-Württemberg)
Das Erste (BR) - DVB-H test

Ham radio and television
Callsign DB0EL
UHF FM relay: 439.275 MHz (International Echolink Network #7385)
SHF FM relay: 1298.2 MHz
APRS digipeater: 144.8 MHz
Callsign DB0TVM
D-Star relay: 439.975 MHz
Amateur television relay: 10194 and 24120 MHz

See also
 List of towers

References

External links

 tum.de: Olympiapark (a student project of the tum/dept Architecture)
 
 Interactive 360degrees view from the tower

Towers completed in 1968
Observation towers in Bavaria
Communication towers in Germany
Buildings and structures in Munich
Tourist attractions in Munich
Towers with revolving restaurants
1968 establishments in West Germany